"If I Had a Ribbon Bow" is Fairport Convention's debut single.

The song written by Hughie Prince and Lou Singer had been recorded previously by Maxine Sullivan (a.k.a. Marietta Williams) in 1936, Odetta (1956), Carolyn Hester (1961), Karen Dalton, The Simon Sisters and Mildred Bailey. Fairport Convention recorded their first album for Track Records in 1968. Their American producer Joe Boyd suggested they release a single. He suggested the old 1930s dance song "If I Had a Ribbon Bow." 

The band cut the song with singer Judy Dyble playing the harmonium. Her legs were not long enough to reach the pedals/bellows so two other members of the group had to pump them. Tristan Fry, a friend of the group, played the vibes at the beginning and end of the song. Ian Matthews, who was then a new member of the group added a few spoken words. "If I had a Ribbon Bow" was released as a 45 with "If," a track from their first album, as the B-side. It was a minor hit on the BBC.

Personnel
Judy Dyble – vocal, harmonium
Ian MacDonald – spoken word
Richard Thompson – electric guitar
Simon Nicol – electric guitar 
Ashley Hutchings – bass guitar
Martin Lamble – drums
with 	
Tristan Fry – vibes

References

Fairport Convention songs
1968 debut singles
Songs with music by Lou Singer
1936 songs
Track Records singles
Song recordings produced by Joe Boyd
Songs written by Hughie Prince